Emmanuel Oreste Zamor (1861– July 27, 1915) was a Haitian general and politician who served as the president of Haiti in 1914.

Biography

During the Haitian civil war of 1912, Oreste Zamor and his brother Charles, both generals, supported Caimito Ramírez and harbored his troops within their districts. In 1914, the two brothers entered the war, resulting in a "short and extremely chaotic" presidency for Oreste from February 8 to October 29 of that year. He was opposed in his bid for the presidency by General Davilmar Théodore, who refused to recognize his authority, and by U.S. businessmen who had financial interests in Haiti.

The U.S. government sought American control of customs in Haiti and of the Môle-Saint-Nicolas from the Zamor government, which first demanded U.S. recognition of its legitimacy. The French and German governments opposed U.S. demands, and Secretary of State William Jennings Bryan submitted a modified proposal (the Farnham Plan, involving oversight of customs and Haitian finance and credit) to Charles Zamor. The Zamors declined to accept the plan unless the U.S. created the appearance that they were under military pressure to do so. The plan was never implemented, and civil strife in Haiti was renewed in the summer of 1914. After four months of fighting, Oreste Zamor was ousted from the presidency and succeeded by Theodore. He was executed the next year by the government of Vilbrun Guillaume Sam.His brother in law was Charlemagne Péralte.

See also
 History of Haiti#Political struggles (1843–1915)

References

1861 births
1915 deaths
Presidents of Haiti
Assassinated Haitian politicians
Assassinated heads of state
People from Centre (department)
Government ministers of Haiti